Roman Jańczyk (10 March 1903 – 18 May 1980) was a Polish footballer. He played in one match for the Poland national football team in 1932.

References

External links
 

1903 births
1980 deaths
Polish footballers
Poland international footballers
Place of birth missing
Association footballers not categorized by position